Sky Scorcher was a nuclear-armed air-to-air missile proposed to the United States Air Force in the 1950s. Intended for use as a weapon for the disruption of enemy bomber formations, it failed to find favor among Air Force planners and did not undergo development.

Development
The Sky Scorcher project was proposed by the Convair Division of General Dynamics to the United States Air Force in 1956. The missile was intended to be carried by an advanced, enlarged version of Convair's F-106 Delta Dart interceptor, which had, at the time, not yet entered flight testing even in its baseline form.

Sky Scorcher was a very large missile, which was projected to be capable of carrying a thermonuclear warhead with a yield of two megatons. A force of eighty of the advanced fighters were proposed for carrying the weapon.

Despite Convair's sales pitch and the anticipated effectiveness of the weapon, the Air Force was unenthusiastic about the concept; aside from the expense of developing the aircraft and weapon, the Sky Scorcher missile also suffered from the fact that there would be significant effects on the ground below the location of an airburst of a multi-megaton nuclear warhead. As a result, the project was abandoned before any significant work was undertaken.

References

Notes

Bibliography

 

 Peacock, Lindsay. "Delta Dart...Last of the Century Fighters". Air International, Vol. 31, No 4, October 1986, pp. 198–206, 217. Stamford, UK: Fine Scroll.

Proposed weapons of the United States
Nuclear missiles of the United States
Abandoned military rocket and missile projects of the United States